Estigmene is a genus of tiger moths in the family Erebidae erected by Jacob Hübner in 1820. The species in the genus are native to North and Central America.

Taxonomy
Many species from Africa and Asia were formerly included into this genus, but have now been separated into different genera.

Species
 Estigmene acrea (Drury, 1773)
 Estigmene albida (Stretch, 1874)

Estigmene sensu lato 
 Estigmene angustipennis (Walker, 1855)
 Estigmene ansorgei Rothschild, 1910
 Estigmene atrifascia (Hampson, 1907)
 Estigmene flaviceps Hampson, 1907
 Estigmene griseata Hampson, 1916
 Estigmene internigralis Hampson, 1905
 Estigmene laglaizei Rothschild, 1910
 Estigmene melanoxantha Gaede, 1926
 Estigmene multivittata Rothschild, 1910
 Estigmene neuriastis Hampson, 1907
 Estigmene ochreomarginata Bethune-Baker, 1909
 Estigmene rothi Rothschild, 1910
 Estigmene sabulosa Romieux, 1943
 Estigmene tenuistrigata Hampson, 1900
 Estigmene testaceoflava Rothschild, 1933
 Estigmene trivitta (Walker, 1855)

References

Spilosomina
Moth genera